Girl Code is an American comedy television series on MTV that debuted on April 23, 2013 that currently airs through Snapchat Discover. It is a spin-off series to Guy Code. The series features actresses, musicians, stand-up comics—plus a few men—who discuss the sisterhood that women share. It was announced on June 13, 2013, that the series had been renewed for a twenty-episode second season, which premiered on October 30, 2013. In April 2014, MTV announced the third season renewal of Girl Code, which premiered on October 1, 2014. In August 2015, MTV premiered a spin-off talk show called Girl Code Live hosted by Awkwafina, Nessa, and Carly Aquilino.

Girl Code was revived for Snapchat Discover by MTV on July 27, 2017 and a second Snap season started in March 2018.

Cast

 Alesha Renee
 Alice Wetterlund
 Andrew Schulz
 Annie Lederman (Season 3–4)
 April Rose (Season 1–2)
 Awkwafina (Season 3–4)
 Carly Aquilino
 Charlamagne tha God
 Chris Distefano
 Clare Glomb
 Emmah Bowers
 Michelle Smith
 Esther Ku (Season 1–3)
 Ilana Becker
 Jade Catta-Preta (Season 3–4)
 Jamie Lee
 Jeff Dye (Season 1–2)
 Jessimae Peluso (Season 1–2)
 Jordan Carlos (Season 1–3)
 Matteo Lane (Season 4)
 Melanie Iglesias (Season 1–3)
 Nessa
 Nicole Byer
 Quinn Marcus
 Shalyah Evans
 Shannon Coffey (Season 4)
 Tanisha Long
 Tiara Thomas (Season 4)

Episodes

Series overview

Season 1 (2013)

Season 2 (2013–14)

Season 3 (2014)

Season 4 (2015)

References

External links
 
 

2010s American comedy television series
2013 American television series debuts
2015 American television series endings
English-language television shows
MTV original programming
American television spin-offs